Asha Kumari  is a leader of Indian National Congress and an All India Congress Committee secretary and  Former AICC in charge of Punjab.
She was a member of the Himachal Pradesh Legislative Assembly from Dalhousie.

She was education minister of the state from 2003 to 2005.

Personal life 
She married Brijendra Singh, son of Lakshman Singh, Raja of Chamba.

Controversy 
On 29 December 2017, Kumari gained controversy after she slapped a female constable during an argument, after which she was slapped back by the constable. She later apologized for her actions.

References

Living people
Indian politicians convicted of crimes
Indian National Congress politicians from Himachal Pradesh
Women in Himachal Pradesh politics
Himachal Pradesh MLAs 2003–2007
State cabinet ministers of Himachal Pradesh
People from Chamba district
1954 births
20th-century Indian women politicians
20th-century Indian politicians
21st-century Indian women politicians
21st-century Indian politicians
People from Chamba, Himachal Pradesh
Women state cabinet ministers of India